Vittoria is a town and  in the province of Ragusa, Sicily, southern Italy. With its 64,212 inhabitants, Vittoria is the second most populated municipality of the province after Ragusa.

History
Vittoria is the youngest town in the province and it presents a modern checkerboard structure, with wide and straight streets. The town's womenfolk are known to still do intricate embroideries, first adopted during the period of Arab rule in Sicily.

Geography
The town was founded on a very fertile valley known as "Boscopiano". On the south of the city there is the "natural reserve of Aleppo pines" (Riserva naturale del Pino d'Aleppo). The coastlines along the sea are low and sandy with rare rocks. The highest point, though poorly mountainous, is Mount Calvo (250 meters). Vittoria is located between the municipalities of Acate and Ragusa, while the hillside is bordered by the towns of Comiso and Chiaramonte Gulfi. It is located 27 km from Ragusa and Gela, 108 km from Siracusa and 131 km from Catania. Vittoria has an altitude of 168 meters s.l.m. and an area of 181.31 km². Its only hamlet (frazione) is the seaside locality of Scoglitti. However, in addition to the urban area, it has 45 different contrade.

Climate
The climate is typically Mediterranean, though slightly higher temperatures are usually recorded when compared to other municipalities in the area, due to the fact the city sits at a lower elevation. The coldest month of the year is January and the hottest July and August.

Economy
Vittoria is an important area in south-eastern Sicily, between the Hyblean plateau and the sea famous for cultivating Nero d’Avola and Frappato - two types of wine grapes destined for very important wines such as Cerasuolo di Vittoria DOCG. The city of Vittoria is home to the largest fruit and vegetable markets in Italy, and is the most important in Europe for tomatoes.

Twin towns — sister cities
Vittoria is twinned with:
  Mátészalka, Hungary
  Siġġiewi, Malta

See also
Scoglitti
Monti Iblei Cup (Hill Climb)
Cerasuolo di Vittoria (wine)
Capuliato (Condiment)
F.C. Vittoria
A.C.D. Città di Vittoria

References

External links

 Official website 
Portal of Vittoria 

 
Municipalities of the Province of Ragusa